Jean Charles Louis Dubois de Gennes (15 April 1814 – 15 May 1876) was a 19th-century French writer, journalist and chansonnier.

A former military and member of the Société du Caveau, collaborator of the Almanach pour rire, he is remembered for his correspondence with Victor Hugo.

He also published under the pseudonym Claudius Transiens.

Works 
1851: Dors-tu Marie ?, melody by Henri Caspers
1862: Le Troupier tel qu'il est à cheval
1865: Les Envieux
1867: La Huronne, scènes de la vie canadienne, by Émile Chevalier (preface)
1869: Sous le casque, rimes à la dragonne, with Victor Hugo (letter)
1874: Chasse aux femmes et aux lions en Algérie

Bibliography 
 Joseph-Marie Quérard, Les supercheries littéraires dévoilées, 1882, (p. 993)
 Henri Frotier de La Messelière, Filiations bretonnes. 1650-1912, vol.6, 1976, (p. 159)

References

External links 
 Sudoc Texts on Sudoc

19th-century French journalists
French male journalists
French chansonniers
1814 births
People from Dumfries
1876 deaths
19th-century French male writers